Going to Hell is the second studio album by American rock band the Pretty Reckless. It was released on March 12, 2014, by Razor & Tie. The album debuted at number five on the Billboard 200 with 35,000 copies sold in its first week, becoming the band's first top-10 album on the chart. Going to Hell spawned five singles, including "Heaven Knows", "Messed Up World (F'd Up World)", and "Follow Me Down", all three of which reached number one on Billboards Mainstream Rock Songs chart.

Background and recording
The band had been recording at Water Music Recording Studios in Hoboken, New Jersey, when the studio was destroyed by Hurricane Sandy in October 2012. After losing a lot of equipment and recordings of songs meant for Going to Hell, they had to re-record a lot of songs they had been working on at the time.

It was confirmed in September 2013 that the Pretty Reckless had parted ways with Interscope Records, followed by the announcement that the band had signed with the Razor & Tie label. In October 2013, it was announced that the band had signed with Cooking Vinyl in Australia.

Release and promotion
On May 30, 2013, the band released a teaser trailer for their second studio album, and premiered a lyric video for the track "Follow Me Down" on June 17, 2013, while the song "Burn" premiered on July 1. The title track "Going to Hell" premiered on Revolver magazine's website on September 19, 2013, and was officially released as the album's first single on September 24. In support of the album, the band embarked on the Going to Hell Tour on September 20, 2013, featuring Heaven's Basement and Louna as opening acts.

The music video for "Going to Hell" premiered on October 16, 2013, while "Heaven Knows" was released on November 19 as the second single from Going to Hell, after premiering on Sirius XM's Octane. The music video for "Heaven Knows" debuted on February 13, 2014. The song peaked at number one on Billboards Mainstream Rock Songs chart, making the Pretty Reckless the second act with a female vocalist to top the chart since 1990, when Alannah Myles' "Black Velvet" reached number two for two weeks.

The track listing, album cover, and release date were announced on January 21, 2014, and a number of limited pre-order bundles were made available on the band's website. The cover art depicts lead singer Taylor Momsen naked from behind, her back decorated with a black cross and arrow pointing to her buttocks. Momsen stated the cover image was inspired by Pink Floyd. "You know that photograph of the women sitting by a pool, nude, with all the record covers painted on their backs? That's one of my favorite posters, so I stole the idea", she told Rolling Stone.

"Fucked Up World" was released on April 22, 2014, as the album's third single, under the title "Messed Up World (F'd Up World)". The music video was filmed in Miami on April 30, and premiered on June 17 on the band's Vevo page. When the single topped the Mainstream Rock Songs chart, the Pretty Reckless became the second female-fronted band to achieve two number-one songs in a row on the chart, following the Pretenders. "House on a Hill" was released on September 28, 2014 as the fourth single from the album. The album's fifth and final single, "Follow Me Down", impacted US active rock radio on November 18, 2014. The song earned the band their third consecutive number one on the Mainstream Rock Songs chart, tying Halestorm for the most number ones by a female-fronted band since the chart launched in 1981.

Critical reception

Going to Hell received mixed to positive reviews from music critics. At Metacritic, which assigns a weighted mean rating out of 100 to reviews from critics, the album received an average score of 58, based on six reviews, which indicates "mixed or average reviews". AllMusic's Stephen Thomas Erlewine found Going to Hell to be "way better" than the band's debut album, Light Me Up, while noticing "a twitchy teen rebellion that fuels the whole enterprise, and that's why Going to Hell works: the group may be following a blueprint, but they believe they're following their own course, and that conviction is convincing." George Garner of Kerrang! opined that "[t]he title track's a good indication of the album as a whole—it's a bit rawer, significantly darker and a lot more Momsenier", concluding, "If Taylor is indeed going to Hell, at least she's released a truly great album on the way down." Jon Wiederhorn of Revolver stated, "She may still be a dirty girl, but Momsen leaves most chick rockers in her rearview mirror thanks to her greatest assets—her daring arrangements and well-crafted tunes." Rolling Stones Chuck Eddy wrote, "This New York band's brash second album rages with the upbeat, beat-wise humor that hard rock has suppressed ever since grunge."

Ray Van Horn Jr. of Blabbermouth.net described the album as "a fierce and entertaining record" and "a shell-shocked, stripped-down form of modern rock 'n roll that sounds at times like Heart in their early years and even their most recent few albums." Davey Boy of Sputnikmusic noted that "'Absolution', 'Fucked Up World' and 'House on a Hill' best showcase [Momsen's] dynamic vocal range, but while concentrating a little too much on her Lolita-like image doesn't blunt the strength of Momsen's voice per se, a by-product is that the tunes rarely capitalize on her understated vulnerability." Boy further commented that "The Pretty Reckless don't do a great deal to prove the cynics wrong here. More frustratingly, they are undoubtedly capable of much better." In a mixed assessment of the album, Q expressed that "[b]latant Queen rip-off 'Heaven Knows' is fun, but it all goes wrong when she breaks out ballads." Bree Davies of Alternative Press panned the album, stating that the band "seems to have tried too hard to come across as outrageous. It's got every contrived reference possible along with clips of brainwashing television sermons and sound bites recreated from cheap porn."

The album was placed at number 12 on Revolvers list of The 20 Best Albums of 2014.

Commercial performance
Going to Hell debuted at number five on the Billboard 200 with first-week sales of 35,000 copies, earning the band their first top-10 album and biggest sales week yet. As of October 2016, the album had sold 225,000 copies in the United States. The album entered the UK Albums Chart at number eight, selling 9,693 copies in its first week. In Japan, it debuted at number 50 on the Oricon Weekly Albums Chart with 1,795 copies sold. On March 17, 2016, the album was certified gold by Music Canada, denoting shipments in excess of 40,000 copies.

Track listing

Personnel
Credits adapted from the liner notes of Going to Hell.

The Pretty Reckless
 Taylor Momsen – lead vocals
 Ben Phillips – guitars, backing vocals
 Mark Damon – bass
 Jamie Perkins – drums

Additional personnel
 Kato Khandwala – production, mixing
 Ted Jensen – mastering
 Jenna Haze – additional vocals on "Follow Me Down"
 Bronxville Union Free School District – additional vocals on "Heaven Knows"
 Jeremy Gillespie – harmonica on "Waiting for a Friend"
 Adam Larson – art direction
 Daniel Hastings – photography

Charts

Weekly charts

Year-end charts

Certifications

Release history

References

2014 albums
Cooking Vinyl albums
The Pretty Reckless albums
Razor & Tie albums
Universal Music Canada albums